Emporio is a village and a community of the Eordaia municipality. Before the 2011 local government reform it was part of the municipality of Mouriki, of which it was a municipal district and the seat. The 2011 census recorded 804 inhabitants in the village.

History
According to Ottoman document from 1626 to 1627, there were 71 Christian households in the village in the first half of the 17th century.

Notable natives
Kroum Pindoff, Bulgarian-Canadian businessman

References

Populated places in Kozani (regional unit)